The Chosen Ones is a 2015 Mexican drama film directed by David Pablos. It was screened in the Un Certain Regard section at the 2015 Cannes Film Festival. The film was named on the shortlist for Mexico's entry for the Academy Award for Best Foreign Language Film at the 89th Academy Awards.

Plot
Ulysis and Sofia are in a relationship. It is revealed that Ulysis is being groomed by his family to entrap his lovers into the prostitution ring that forms his family's business. Having fallen for Sofia, his first lover, Ulysis puts up an unsuccessful fight to prevent her from being exploited. His father agrees to let Sofia free only when Ulysis gets another girl to replace her in the brothel. Thus he sets toward honeytrapping his next victim.

Meanwhile, Sofia is forced into sexual slavery and is losing hope after seeing that her possibility of escape is very slim. By chance she encounters a good samaritan pretending to be a client who plans to help her escape; but before she has a chance to act Ulysis arrives and takes Sofia away to live with him having forced another girl, Marta, to take her place.

Sofia is then forced by Ulysis's family to stay with him as her "saviour" and told that she will help care for the children of the house(some of whom are hostages because they are the children of other enslaved women) and she cannot see her family or she may be returned to the brothel. Sofia is traumatized by the horrific abuse she has endured and is not the same carefree girl that Ulysis remembers. She also realizes another girl has been trapped by Ulysis as her replacement and struggles with this thought. Ulysis seems to feel grief over what has happened but besides making her his in the eyes of his family makes no effort to free her.  The film ends with Sofia and Ulysis on a deceptively normal outing with Ulysis's family; Sofia sits silently in fear across from Ulysis.

Critical reception
The film was well received by critics. Review aggregator Rotten Tomatoes reports that 85% of 26 critics gave the film a positive review, for an average rating of 8/10.

Awards and nominations

References

External links

2015 films
2015 drama films
2010s Spanish-language films
Best Picture Ariel Award winners
Mexican drama films
Films set in Tijuana
Films shot in Tijuana
Films about prostitution in Mexico
Films about human trafficking
Works about sex trafficking
2010s Mexican films